aka Dutch Wife of the Wasteland and The Dutch Wives of the Wild, originally released as , is a 1967 Japanese pink film written and directed by cult filmmaker Atsushi Yamatoya, starring the first "Queen" of pink film, Noriko Tatsumi, and with music by the noted jazz pianist, Yōsuke Yamashita.

Synopsis
A wealthy real estate investor receives a film showing the rape and murder of his girlfriend. He hires a private detective, and shows him the film—which he criticizes for its poor cinematography—so that the detective can find the criminals and bring them to justice. The detective discovers that the woman is not dead, but doesn't inform his employer because the detective has romantic intentions towards her as well. His search leads him to a warehouse in the wastelands, filled with flies and sex dolls modeled on the woman. A gunshot is heard and the detective is engaged in target practice in the desert with the realtor. The realtor says he has a case he would like to be investigated, which returns the film to the first scene.

Cast
 Noriko Tatsumi as Sae
 Yūichi Minato as Jō 
 Miki Watari as Mina
 Shōhei Yamamoto as Kō
 Seigi [Masayoshi] Nogami as Naka
 Hatsuo Yamaya as Doctor
 Mari Nagisa as Rie
 Akaji Maro
 Taka Ôkubo
 Kohei Tsuzaki

Background
Director Atsushi Yamatoya was one of the group of writers on Seijun Suzuki's Branded to Kill (1967). Yamatoya had co-directed the pink film  with Kōji Wakamatsu in 1966, but Inflatable Sex Doll of the Wastelands was his solo feature film directorial debut. 
He often wrote anonymously for Wakamatsu during the 1960s, and was later regularly credited for his script work at Nikkatsu on their Roman porno series. He revisited the sex-doll theme in his script to Chūsei Sone's Roman porno Love Doll Report: An Adult Toy (1975). Sone was one of Yamatoya's co-workers on Branded to Kill, and Yamatoya wrote several of Sone's Roman porno scripts, notably Showa Woman: Naked Rashomon, an erotic restructuring of Kurosawa's Rashomon (1950).

Yukihiro Sawada, who worked with Yamatoya on the script for Inflatable Sex Doll of the Wastelands, also went on to work at Nikkatsu, where he directed such Roman porno'''s as Sex Hunter: Wet Target (1972). During the filming of Inflatable Sex Doll of the Wastelands, lead actors Noriko Tatsumi and Yūichi Minato worked together on director Ario Takeda's pink film Love's Milky Drops for Okura Eiga studio. This film used the same sets as Yamatoya's.Weisser, p. 254.

Critical appraisal
In their Japanese Cinema Encyclopedia: The Sex Films, the Weissers write that Inflatable Sex Doll of the Wastelands is "one of the major cult films of the '60s". They give the film a rating of three out of four stars, noting that, due to the surrealistic and hallucinatory nature of the plot, the film may not be to all viewers' tastes. They judge the film is "even more eccentric" than director Seijun Suzuki's Branded to Kill (1967), which Atsushi Yamatoya helped write. According to the Weissers, despite several very erotic scenes, because the film emphasizes a hard-boiled mystery plot rather than sexploitation, it is not technically a pink film.

Jasper Sharp writes that the film shows how versatile the pink film genre could sometimes be, calling it "probably the most idiosyncratic work the genre has ever produced", and noting that it out-does Suzuki's Branded to Kill in terms of "dreamlike illogicality". Of the plot, Sharp writes that, in spite of its disjointed nature, "as with Suzuki's film, there is clearly some method behind the onscreen madness". Sharp remarks that a comparison with Suzuki's better-known film is inevitable. Besides the sharing of a main character's name ("Joe") with the star of Suzuki's film (Joe Shishido), Sharp lists some similarities between the films: "the striking high-contrast monochrome cinematography; the quirky, hard-boiled performances; the hypnotic disjunction between sound and image; the use of montage to construct a surreal, alien-looking landscape that bears little resemblance to any recognisable vision of Japan; and the atonal jazz soundtrack, full of chaotic fanfares that blare out to punctuate the action."

AvailabilityInflatable Sex Doll of the Wastelands, first known as Horror Doll, was released theatrically on October 3, 1967. It was released in VHS format in Japan in May 1997, and on DVD on August 23, 2002.Chirashis'', or movie flyers, advertised this DVD release as "60s Sex Play". The film's title was also used for a book on Yamatoya's films issued in June 1994.

Notes

Bibliography

English

Japanese
 
 
 

1967 films
1960s Japanese-language films
Pink films
1960s Japanese films